Elishah or Eliseus ( ’Ĕlīšā) was the son of Javan according to the Book of Genesis (10:4) in the Masoretic Text. The Greek Septuagint of Genesis 10 lists Elisa not only as the son of Javan, but also a grandson of Japheth. His name is spelled differently in Hebrew to the prophet Elisha, ending in a hei instead of an ayin.

Scholars have often identified Elishah with Cypriots, as in ancient times the island of Cyprus or part of it was known as Alashiya.
According to the Jewish encyclopedia Elishah is to be identified with Magna Graecia and Sicels. Judean historian Flavius Josephus related the descendants of Elishah with the Aeolians, one of the ancestral branches of the Greeks. Other proposed scholarly identifications are with Hellas and Carthage ("Elissa").

Elishah is also mentioned in the mediaeval, rabbinic Book of Jasher (Hebrew transliteration: Sefer haYashar); he is said in Jasher to have been the ancestor of the "Almanim", possibly a reference to Germanic tribes (Alemanni). An older and more common tradition refers to him as a settler of Greece, particularly Elis in the Peloponnese.

Portuguese traditions
Portuguese folklore traditionally makes Elishah (under the name Lysias/Lísias) an ancestor and predecessor of Lusus (Elisha being older, having arrived accompanying his uncle Tubal founding Portalegre in 1900 BC under Iberian king Brigo). Lysias' own supposed tomb (in Portalegre) claims that he was the first "cultivator" of Lusitania. Lusus' reign is traditionally placed in the 16th - 15th centuries BC, e.g., in the Livro Primeiro da Monarchia Lusitana. All this is debated; Lusus has also been described as coming before Lysias, who would thus be too late to be Elishah or vaguely at the same time, or even the same individual under different names. Lusus is sometimes called a son of Baccus and of the lineage of Lysias, or the other way around, or even a mere companion.

The Portuguese orator and mythographer Father António Vieira (1608-1697) refers to Elishah (under his actual biblical name) as founder and eponym of Lisbon and Lusitania (when he came to Iberia with his uncle Tubal), as well as the origin of the name of the mythological Elysium. Vieira also identified Elisha's biblical brother Tarshish as the founder of Tartesos in Andalucia, implying both would have come to Iberia with Tubal (though this isn't the only theory on the identity of Tarshish). Elishah in this Portuguese portrayal is identified with Bacchus' captain Lysias/Lísias, sometimes also with Lusus and Phoroneus, and is referred to as the founder of Portalegre and being buried at the Ermida de São Cristovão (Chapel of Saint Christopher) inside the town.

See also
 Dodanim
 Javan
 Kittim
 Tarshish
 Sons of Noah

References

Book of Genesis people
Hebrew Bible nations
Japheth
Portuguese mythology
Noach (parashah)